The Boano monarch (Symposiachrus boanensis), or black-chinned monarch, is a species of bird in the family Monarchidae endemic to Indonesia. It is found on Boano island in the southern Mollucas. Its natural habitats are subtropical or tropical moist lowland forest and subtropical or tropical moist shrubland. It is threatened by habitat loss.

Taxonomy and systematics
This species was originally described as a subspecies of the spectacled monarch and then classified as a separate species in the genus Monarcha until moved to Symposiachrus in 2009. The name 'black-chinned monarch' is also used as an alternate name for the black-winged monarch.

References

External links
BirdLife Species Factsheet.

Boano monarch
Birds of the Maluku Islands
Critically endangered fauna of Asia
Boano monarch
Taxonomy articles created by Polbot